Johnny Ray Salling (born October 31, 1961) is an American politician from Maryland from the Republican Party. He is currently serving as a Maryland State Senator representing District 6, which covers southeast Baltimore County, including Dundalk, Essex and Rosedale.

Early life and career 
Salling was born in Baltimore, Maryland on October 31, 1961, where he graduated from Sparrows Point High School. In 1979, he joined the United States Army, serving as a combat engineer until 1981. Upon his return to the United States, he worked as a steel worker for LaFarge of North America at the Bethlehem Steel Mill in Sparrows Point, Maryland for more than 30 years, where he gained experience as a union representative for the United Steelworkers of America union.

In September 2013, Salling filed to run for Maryland Senate, seeking to succeed Democratic state senator Norman Stone, who had announced his retirement from the General Assembly. He says that the closing of the Sparrows Point mill in 2012 moved him to run for public office. Stone endorsed his challenger, state delegate John Olszewski Jr., during the general election. Salling defeated Olszewski in the general election, garnering 47.9 percent of the vote compared to Olszewski's 44.7 percent.

In the legislature 
Salling was sworn into the Maryland Senate on January 14, 2015. He has filed to run for re-election in the 2022 Maryland Senate elections.

In April 2017, Salling joined the Reform on Tap task force, which was led by Comptroller Peter Franchot and sought to reform the state's regulations on the production and distribution of beer in the state.

Committee assignments 
 Member, Budget and Taxation Committee, 2019–present (public safety, transportation & environment subcommittee, 2019, 2021–present; health & human services subcommittee, 2020)
 Joint Committee on the Chesapeake and Atlantic Coastal Bays Critical Area, 2015–present
 Joint Committee on Ending Homelessness, 2019–present
 Protocol Committee, 2019–present
 Spending Affordability Committee, 2021–present
 Member, Joint Committee on Fair Practices and State Personnel Oversight, 2015–2016
 Education, Health and Environmental Affairs Committee, 2015–2018 (environment subcommittee, 2015–2018)
 Joint Committee on Children, Youth, and Families, 2019–2020

Other memberships 
 Member, Maryland Military Installation Legislative Caucus, 2017–present
 Maryland Veterans Caucus, 2018–present (senate executive board, 2022–present)

2020 House of Representatives election campaign 

In August 2019, Salling announced his candidacy for Maryland's 2nd congressional district in the 2020 elections, seeking to take on incumbent Democrat Dutch Ruppersberger. He did not have to give up his state senate seat to run for Congress, as he was not up for reelection until 2022. Salling narrowly won the Republican nomination, earning 19.1 percent of the vote in the primary election. He was defeated by Ruppersberger in the general election, receiving 33 percent of the vote.

Political positions

Environment 
In 2018, the Maryland League of Conservation Voters gave Salling a score of 17 percent on its annual legislative scorecard – the lowest score in the Maryland Senate.

During a debate on a sweeping climate action bill in March 2021, Salling introduced an amendment that would lower the bill's pollution reduction goal from 60 percent to 50 percent, contending that it was too ambitious. The amendment was rejected by a vote of 15-31.

Immigration 
Salling denounced an executive order issued by Baltimore County executive Kevin Kamenetz in April 2017 that formalized police policy on undocumented immigrants in the county, calling it "dangerous".

Marijuana 
Salling says that he does not agree with the legalization of recreational marijuana, but he does accept that cannabis does have some medicinal benefits.

Policing 
Salling supports providing police departments with additional funding and training and disagrees with calls to defund police departments and invest in community social services.

Controversy 
In July 2019, Salling responded to a tweet about a request for an ethics investigation into U.S. Representative Ilhan Omar with "Get rid of this illegal know!!!!!" The Council on American–Islamic Relations called on Salling to apologize for the tweet or to resign. He deleted the tweet after speaking to The Baltimore Sun, denying having made the tweet and suggesting that he may have been hacked.

Electoral history

References 

1961 births
21st-century American politicians
Living people
Republican Party Maryland state senators
Politicians from Baltimore
Candidates in the 2020 United States elections